Rosanna Sze Hang-yu is an Olympic swimmer from Hong Kong and record holder of 9 Hong Kong Swimming Records, plus former holder of 16 HK records. She has broken Hong Kong records for 108 times across 19 years (2002-2021), showing her longevity in the sport.   

She has swum for Hong Kong at the Olympics (2004, 2012, 2016), Long Course World Championship (2003, 2005, 2007, 2009, 2011, 2013, 2015 and 2017), Short Course World Championship (2004, 2006, 2010, 2012, 2016, 2018, 2021 and 2022) and Asian Games (2006, 2010, 2014, 2018), among other international events.

At the 2012 Summer Olympics she finished 20th overall in the Women's 200 Freestyle and failed to reach the semifinals.

References

1988 births
Hong Kong female freestyle swimmers
Hong Kong female butterfly swimmers
Living people
Olympic swimmers of Hong Kong
Swimmers at the 2004 Summer Olympics
Swimmers at the 2012 Summer Olympics
Swimmers at the 2016 Summer Olympics
Asian Games medalists in swimming
Swimmers at the 2006 Asian Games
Swimmers at the 2010 Asian Games
Swimmers at the 2014 Asian Games
Swimmers at the 2018 Asian Games
Asian Games silver medalists for Hong Kong
Asian Games bronze medalists for Hong Kong
Medalists at the 2006 Asian Games
Medalists at the 2010 Asian Games
Medalists at the 2014 Asian Games
Medalists at the 2018 Asian Games